Meomyia is a genus of flies belonging to the family Bombyliidae (bee flies).

Species
 Meomyia albiceps (Macquart 1848)
 Meomyia australis (Guerin-Meneville 1831)
 Meomyia callynthrophora (Schiner 1868)
 Meomyia fasciculata (Macquart 1840)
 Meomyia pausaria (Jaennicke 1867)
 Meomyia penicillata (Macquart 1850)
 Meomyia sericans (Macquart 1850)
 Meomyia tetratricha (Walker 1849)
 Meomyia vetusta (Walker 1849)
 Meomyia yeatesi Evenhuis & Greathead 1999

References

Bombyliidae
Bombyliidae genera